The White Lion is a Grade II listed public house at 14–16 High Street, Putney, London, close to the southern end of Putney Bridge.

It was built in 1887.

It later became a Slug and Lettuce chain pub, then The Litten Tree, then a Walkabout chain pub, then Wahoo, a sports bar. As of June 2019, it has been empty for over six years.

References

External links
 

Pubs in the London Borough of Wandsworth
Grade II listed pubs in London
Grade II listed buildings in the London Borough of Wandsworth
Commercial buildings completed in 1887
Putney